Isaiah Todd (born October 17, 2001) is an American professional basketball player for the Washington Wizards of the National Basketball Association (NBA). He was a consensus five-star recruit and one of the best power forwards in the 2020 class. A former Michigan commit, Todd chose to forgo his college eligibility to become the first player in history to sign with NBA G League Ignite. He finished his high school career at the Word of God Christian Academy in Raleigh, North Carolina.

Early life
Born in Baltimore, Maryland, Todd was raised by his mother, Marlene Venable, and did not know his father well. His mother sold cocaine and heroin at age twelve and served over three years in prison when she was sixteen. She was released from prison about four years before Todd's birth. When Todd started playing basketball, at age seven, he stood five feet tall. At that age, he met his first coach, Derrick Wilson, and began playing on recreational teams and on the Amateur Athletic Union (AAU) circuit. Before eighth grade, Todd moved to Richmond, Virginia so that he could play year-round for his AAU program, Team Loaded.

High school career
In his first two years of high school, Todd played basketball for John Marshall High School in Richmond. As a freshman, he averaged 12.8 points and 6.5 rebounds per game, leading his team to district and regional titles. Todd was considered one of the area's best prospects since Basketball Hall of Fame inductee Moses Malone. As a sophomore, Todd averaged 18.6 points, 6.5 rebounds and 1.8 blocks per game, shooting 39 percent from three-point range, to help John Marshall win the Class 3 state championship. He was recognized as the Class 3 State Player of the Year and earned first-team All-Metro honors.

For his junior season, Todd transferred to Trinity Academy, a private Christian school in Raleigh, North Carolina, on a scholarship. He was drawn there by coach Bryan Burrell, who he had previously worked with. Moving to Raleigh also allowed him to work closely with his personal trainer, Drew Hanlen. Todd led the team, which had been coming off two losing seasons, to a 21–12 record while averaging 28 points and 15 rebounds per game. He was named USA Today All-USA North Carolina Player of the Year. Todd transferred to another private Christian school in Raleigh, Word of God Christian Academy, for his final high school season, playing under Byron Williams in The Grind Session. As a senior, he was selected to play in the McDonald's All-American Game and the Jordan Brand Classic, but both games were cancelled due to the COVID-19 pandemic.

Recruiting
Entering his sophomore season at John Marshall, Todd was ranked as the number one recruit in the 2020 class by ESPN. On October 17, 2019, he committed to play college basketball for Michigan over offers from Kansas, Kentucky and North Carolina, among others. At the time, Todd was a consensus top-15 player in his class. On April 14, 2020, he decommitted from Michigan and announced that he would forgo his college eligibility to pursue a professional career.

Professional career

NBA G League Ignite (2020–2021) 
On April 17, 2020, Todd signed a one-year contract with the NBA G League Ignite, a developmental team affiliated with the NBA G League. He was drawn to the G League because he wanted to "learn from pros and learn from NBA coaches and trainers." Todd averaged 12.3 points and 4.9 rebounds per game.

Washington Wizards (2021–present)
Todd was selected in the second round of the 2021 NBA draft with the 31st pick by the Milwaukee Bucks. He was subsequently traded to the Indiana Pacers for the draft rights of the 54th and 60th picks, Sandro Mamukelashvili and Georgios Kalaitzakis, and two future second-round draft picks. He was then traded to his hometown team, the Washington Wizards, alongside Aaron Holiday for the draft rights of Isaiah Jackson, in a five-team trade.

On January 28, 2022, the Wizards suspended Todd for one game for "conduct detrimental to the team."

Todd appeared in 12 games for the Wizards during the 2021-2022 season.

Career statistics

NBA

|-
| style="text-align:left;"| 
| style="text-align:left;"| Washington
| 12 || 0 || 6.2 || .269 || .250 || .333 || 1.0 || .3 || .3 || .2 || 1.7
|- class="sortbottom"
| style="text-align:center;" colspan="2"| Career
| 12 || 0 || 6.2 || .269 || .250 || .333 || 1.0 || .3 || .3 || .2 || 1.7

National team career
Todd won a gold medal with the United States at the 2017 FIBA Under-16 Americas Championship in Formosa, Argentina. He averaged 5.4 points and 5.2 rebounds per game in five games.

References

External links
NBA G League profile
USA Basketball bio

2001 births
Living people
American men's basketball players
Basketball players from Baltimore
Capital City Go-Go players
McDonald's High School All-Americans
Milwaukee Bucks draft picks
NBA G League Ignite players
Power forwards (basketball)
Washington Wizards players